Neves, is the Portuguese word for the plural form of "snow". It is a common surname in Portugal, Italy, Brazil, and the Spanish region of Galicia. A Spanish variant is Nieves.

The surname is supposedly connected to the veneration of  Our Lady of the Snows, the name being given to a village  in the northwest of Portugal.

People with this name

Sportspeople

Footballers
Bruno Ferraz das Neves (born 1984), Brazilian footballer
Carlos César Neves (born 1987), Brazilian footballer
Carlos das Neves (born 1968). South African footballer and coach
Cristiano dos Santos Neves (born 1981), Brazilian footballer
Daniel Soares Neves (born 1980), Brazilian-Spanish footballer
Denílson Pereira Neves (born 1988), Brazilian footballer
Diego Neves (born 1986), Brazilian footballer
Domingos Neves ( 1925), Portuguese footballer
Eugénio Neves (born 1987), Portuguese footballer
Fernando Pascoal Neves, (1947–1973), Portuguese footballer
Gylmar dos Santos Neves (1930–2013), Brazilian footballer
Hermes Neves Soares (born 1975), Brazilian footballer
Hernâni Neves (born 1963), Portuguese footballer and beach soccer player
Jedaias Capucho Neves (born 1979), Brazilian footballer
Joaquim Neves (born 1970), Portuguese footballer
Jorge Neves (footballer, born 1969), Portuguese football player and coach
Jorge Neves (footballer, born 1987), Portuguese football player
Kévin das Neves (born 1986), French footballer
Luciano da Rocha Neves (born 1993), Brazilian footballer
Manny Neves (born 1960), Portuguese-American soccer player
Marcos Neves (born 1988), Brazilian footballer
Michel Neves Dias (born 1980), Brazilian footballer
Nando Maria Neves (born 1978), Cape Verdean footballer
Pedro das Neves Correia (born 1974), Portuguese footballer
Pedro Rocha Neves (born 1994), Brazilian footballer
Ricardo Neves (born 1989), Portuguese footballer
Rodolfo Xavier Neves (born 1989), Brazilian footballer
Rúben das Neves (born 1991), Portuguese footballer
Rúben Neves (born 1997), Portuguese footballer
Rui Neves (footballer, born 1965), Portuguese footballer
Rui Neves (footballer, born 1969), Portuguese footballer
Serafim Neves (1920–1989), Portuguese footballer
Sérgio André Pereira Neves (born 1993), Portuguese footballer
Sérgio Ricardo Messias Neves (born 1974), Brazilian Footballer
Thiago Neves (born 1985), Brazilian footballer
Vinícius Neves da Silva (born 1982), Brazilian footballer

Other sports
Bruno Neves (1981–2008), Portuguese road racing cyclist
Cláudia das Neves (born 1975), Brazilian women's basketball player
Hélio Castroneves (born "Hélio Castro Neves", 1975), Brazilian auto racing driver
Mario Neves (basketball) (born 1979) is a Cape Verdean-Portuguese basketball player
Pedro Miguel Neves (born 1968), Portuguese basketball player
Ralph Neves (1916–1995), US horse racing jockey

Others
Aécio Neves (born 1960), Brazilian economist and politician
Alda Neves da Graça do Espírito Santo (1926–2010), São Toméan poet, politician, and national anthem lyricist
Alice Leonor das Neves Costa (born ?), Macanese judge
André Neves (born 1975). Portuguese mathematician
António Castanheira Neves (born 1929), Portuguese legal philosopher and professor
Carlos Augusto R. Santos-Neves (born 1944), Brazilian ambassador to the UK (2008–2010)
David Neves (1938–1994), Brazilian film director and screenwriter
Emily Neves (born 1982), US actress, singer, script writer, and voice director
Graciano dos Santos Neves (1868–1922), Brazilian physician and politician
Infanta Maria das Neves of Portugal (1852–1941), Portuguese duchess of San Jaime
José Neves (born 1974), Portuguese billionaire businessman, founder of Farfetch
José Maria Neves (born 1960), Cape Verdean politician and former Prime Minister
Lucas Moreira Neves (1925–2002), Brazilian Cardinal Bishop and Prefect of the Congregation for Bishops
Maria das Neves (born 1958), São Tomé and Príncipe politician and former Prime Minister
Mario Das Neves (1951–2017), Argentine politician
Mário Neves (1912–1993), Portuguese journalist and diplomat
Oscar Castro-Neves (1940–2013), Brazilian guitarist, arranger, and composer
Pedro Luís Neves (born 1955), Portuguese composer, musician, and music producer
Tancredo Neves (1910–1985), Brazilian lawyer, entrepreneur, and president-elect of Brazil (died before taking office)
Vivien Neves (1947–2002), British glamour model
Walter Neves (born 1957), Brazilian anthropologist, archaeologist, and biologist
Wilson das Neves (1936–2017), Brazilian musician (percussionist)

See also
Nieves, Spanish equivalent

References

Portuguese-language surnames

de:Neves (Begriffsklärung)
pt:Neves